WJOS (1540 AM) was a radio station broadcasting a Southern gospel format, licensed to Elkin, North Carolina.

History
Al Hinshaw signed on WIFM-FM in Elkin in 1949, and added an AM station several years later. Both stations had difficulties but they survived. James Childress bought the stations in 1954. WIFM-AM was a daytime-only station, but the FM station aired programming at night.

The AM and FM stations aired the same programming (the AM went off the air at night) until FCC rules prohibited this more than a few hours a day. By this time, enough people had FM radios that separate programming became possible.

In the mid-70s, Leon Reece's "Good Morning Show" and "Open Mike" aired on both stations.  The AM aired pop/rock music.

In the early 80s the FM studio moved and the AM station took over the former FM studio.

WIFM-AM later became WJOS (for Jonesville, where the station moved) and its format was Southern gospel from the late 80s until 1995. John Wishon was station manager and morning host most of those years.

External links

Defunct radio stations in the United States
Defunct religious radio stations in the United States
Radio stations disestablished in 1995
1995 disestablishments in North Carolina
JOS
JOS